Bulls Bridge Power Station was a 280 MW open-cycle gas-turbine power station at Bull's Bridge, Hayes in west London. It was decommissioned in 1993 and later demolished.

History
The station was built, owned and operated by the CEGB as a stand-alone open cycle GT station and was commissioned in June 1981 but was later mothballed. It occupied a  site on either side of Yeading Brook, to the south of the Paddington main line and north of the Grand Union Canal, at its junction with the Paddington Arm.

It was built as a peak lopping and rapid response plant to augment base load generation. It had a total generating capacity of 280 MW. It comprised four 70 MW generator sets each one being powered by four industrial Olympus gas generators, two at either end of the central alternator.  It was connected electrically to the North Hyde 66 kV substation. By 1989 the gross capability was given as 3 x 70 MW plus 1 x 35 MW.

Bulls Bridge typically ran at full power for intervals of 10 minutes to 1 hour. As a result of the UK miners' strike (1984–1985) the station was re-opened in the 1980s, During the year ending 31 March 1986 Bulls Bridge supplied 4.697 GWh of electricity, it's thermal efficiency was 20.02 per cent, and the load factor was 0.5 per cent.

On privatisation, the station was owned and run by Powergen, and ceased generating in 1993. The site has since been redeveloped and the station demolished. The western parcel of land is occupied by a British Airways engineering centre.

References

Natural gas-fired power stations in England
Former power stations in London
Demolished power stations in the United Kingdom